Shaparak Khorsandi (born 8 June 1973), later and now formerly known as Shappi Khorsandi, is an Iranian-born British comedian and author. She is the daughter of the Iranian political satirist and poet Hadi Khorsandi. Her family left Iran for the United Kingdom following the Islamic Revolution.

In January 2016, she became President of Humanists UK and Vice-President in 2019. Her second book and first novel, Nina is Not OK, was published in 2016.

Background and early life 
Shaparak Khorsandi was born on 8 June 1973 in Tehran. Her parents were Fatemah, and the satirist and poet Hadi Khorsandi. The family fled from Iran to London after the Islamic Revolution following a joke that her father composed which was seen as critical of the revolutionary regime.

Khorsandi graduated from King Alfred's College, now the University of Winchester, in 1995, with a degree in Drama, Theatre and Television. After graduating, she worked in various roles including at a community theatre, in a sandwich shop, as a telephone fundraiser and as a nude life model, whilst starting her career as a stand-up comedian. In 2010, the university awarded her an honorary doctorate.

Khorsandi was raised without any religion, and identifies as an atheist and a humanist. She later became a patron of Humanists UK, which appointed her as its President for a three-year term from January 2016, succeeding Jim Al-Khalili. She became vice-president of the group in 2019.

Until June 2021, she was known professionally as Shappi Khorsandi. Khorsandi explained in The Independent about her decision to revert to using her full name, Shaparak, professionally. Having had her full name mocked and mispronounced when she was a child, she decided to be known as "Shappi" from the age of 16, but eventually decided that this was an attempt "to bend in a direction which would make my foreignness more comfortable for other people" and to revert to using her original name.

Career in comedy 
Khorsandi performs comedy, having been a performer at Joe Wilson's Comedy Madhouse throughout 1997. She has appeared on many BBC Radio 4 programmes, including Quote... Unquote, Loose Ends, You and Yours, Midweek, Just A Minute, The Now Show and The News Quiz, as well as BBC Television's Have I Got News For You and QI. In July 2009, she hosted her own four-part series, Shappi Talk on BBC Radio 4, examining what it is like growing up in multi-cultural families. She also writes an occasional column for online magazine Iranian.com. Her Iranian heritage and reactions to it are frequently referenced in her comedy performances.

In 2007, Khorsandi made her first trip to Australia and the Melbourne Comedy Festival with her show Asylum Speaker. She also appeared live on the Australia comedy talk show Rove. Later, she was nominated for best breakthrough act at the 2007 Chortle Awards. In December 2008, she appeared on the BBC stand-up television show Live at the Apollo alongside Russell Kane and Al Murray. She also made an appearance on Michael McIntyre's Comedy Roadshow on 20 June 2009, Friday Night with Jonathan Ross on 26 June 2009 and 8 Out of 10 Cats on 10 July 2009. She performed her show, The Distracted Activist, at the Edinburgh Festival Fringe from 6 to 31 August 2009.

Khorsandi was a panellist on Question Time in 2006, and returned on 14 January 2010. During that show, she mentioned that she supports Labour. She performed "Mickey" on the second episode of Let's Dance for Sport Relief 2010.

In 2010, Khorsandi took part in Channel 4's Comedy Gala, a benefit show held in aid of Great Ormond Street Children's Hospital, filmed live at the O2 Arena in London on 30 March. She appeared as a guest in Genius hosted by Dave Gorman on 31 October 2010. In March 2012, Khorsandi appeared on Channel 4's The Celebrity Bank Job and won £59,000 for her chosen charities.

Topics in her 2011 show Me and My Brother in Our Pants, Holding Hands included her relationship with her brother, divorce, flashers, and her mother's low self-esteem. Tim Richards of The Age gave a positive review, writing that it was "not wet-your-pants material, but it's an absorbing hour".

Khorsandi is a member of the Arts Emergency Service, a British charity working with 16- to 19-year-olds in further education from diverse backgrounds.

In 2014, Khorsandi was a guest panellist on Loose Women, filling in for Jamelia. She appeared on The Blame Game on BBC Northern Ireland hosted by Tim McGarry on 5 December 2014.

In 2016, Khorsandi appeared with her son on Big Star's Little Star.  Also that year, along with other celebrities, Khorsandi toured the UK to support Jeremy Corbyn's bid to become Prime Minister. Khorsandi appeared as a contestant on the seventeenth series of I'm a Celebrity...Get Me Out of Here! in November 2017 and was placed 11th in the competition.

Books
Khorsandi's memoir, A Beginner's Guide to Acting English, was published by Ebury Press on 2 July 2009. The book describes the way in which Khorsandi experienced England as a young girl. The narrative begins with her attending nursery school, The Kings' International Nursery School, with her brother, Peyvand. Throughout the book, she explains the ways in which the Persian language differs from English: "They called me 'poppet'. Iranians said 'jaan' or 'azizam'." She also expresses pride in how her father took English classes and was praised for his affinity with the written word, though she also felt he was able to be more humorous in Persian.

Other themes include her experiences with English food and customs, the war between Iran and Iraq, and the hostilities that she and her family encounter—she notes, for example, having been referred to as a terrorist.

Her second book and first novel, Nina is Not OK, was published in 2016. The titular character is a teenager living with alcohol abuse. It was nominated for the Jhalak Prize, a literary award for Black, Asian and minority ethnic writers, but Khorsandi asked for it to be removed from consideration, telling an interviewer that "For once in my career I'd done something not about identity ... and I get a sticker for being brown."

Khorsandi's first young adult fiction novel Kissing Emma, published on 2 September 2021, was inspired by the life of Emma Hamilton.

Personal life
Khorsandi married fellow comedian Christian Reilly in 2005, with whom she has a son. They divorced in 2011. Her daughter was born in June 2013. In a 2014 interview she said "I'm doing it all on my own, I have no contact with the father. But that's fine, I'm not angry or bitter." Khorsandi is currently in a relationship with fellow comedian Mark Steel.

Her brother Peyvand also did stand-up comedy for a while but decided to pursue a career in journalism. The siblings were raised bilingual and Khorsandi is fluent in Farsi.

Khorsandi was diagnosed with attention deficit hyperactivity disorder in 2016. In 2017, she came out as bisexual. She has participated in several half-marathons.

Tours and live shows

Filmography
Television

Radio

Publications

Awards, honours and nominations

Bibliography

See also
Iranian stand-up comedy

Notes

References

External links

Shappi Khorsandi at Comedy CV
Iranian diaspora: Shappi Khorsandi at BBC News Online
Chortle account

1973 births
Living people
Alumni of the University of Winchester
Bisexual novelists
Bisexual women
British stand-up comedians
British women comedians
British people of Iranian descent
Comedians from London
People from Ealing
British atheists
British humanists
British women novelists
Iranian emigrants to the United Kingdom
Bisexual comedians
Iranian LGBT novelists
British LGBT novelists
People from Tehran
BBC 100 Women
20th-century British comedians
21st-century British comedians
Labour Party (UK) people
I'm a Celebrity...Get Me Out of Here! (British TV series) participants
British LGBT comedians